College soccer is played by teams composed of soccer players who are enrolled in colleges and universities.  While it is most widespread in the United States, it is also prominent in Japan, South Korea, Canada, and as well as in South Africa and the Philippines. The United Kingdom also has a university league. The institutions typically hire full-time professional coaches and staff, although the student athletes are mostly amateur and are not paid. College soccer in the United States is sponsored by the National Collegiate Athletic Association (NCAA), the sports regulatory body for major universities, and by the governing bodies for smaller universities and colleges. This sport is played on a rectangular field of the dimensions of about 70–75 yards sideline to sideline (width), and 115–120 yards goal line to goal line (length).

College soccer teams play a variety of conference and non-conference games throughout the fall season, with the season culminating in the post-season tournament called the College Cup. The St. Louis University Billikens is the most successful men's team, having won 10 College Cups while the North Carolina Tar Heels led by head coach Anson Dorrance is the most successful women's college soccer team with 21 College Cup wins.

The best men's and women's college soccer player each year is awarded the Hermann Trophy.

After their collegiate careers, top men's players often go on to play professionally in Major League Soccer or other professional leagues while top women's players may play professionally in the National Women's Soccer League or in other professional soccer leagues around the world including Division 1 Féminine in France, Damallsvenskan in Sweden, Germany's Frauen-Bundesliga,  Australia's W-League, or Japan's Nadeshiko League.

History 

The first de facto college football game held in the U.S. in 1869 between Rutgers University and Princeton was contested, at Rutgers captain John W. Leggett's request, with rules mixing soccer and rugby and loosely based on those of the Football Association in London, England. As a result, it is considered the first collegiate soccer match and the birth of soccer in the United States.

However other sports historians argue that this was actually the first-ever college gridiron football season in history. But that perception is changing, with Harvard being recognized as a pioneer in gridiron football, along with McGill, Tufts, and Yale.

The NCAA first began holding a men's national soccer championship in 1959. Prior to 1959, the men's national champion had been determined by a national poll instead of through a national tournament. Saint Louis University won the 1959 inaugural championship using mostly local players, defeating a number of teams that were mostly foreign players. Saint Louis continued to dominate the Division I championship for a number of years, appearing in five consecutive finals from 1959 to 1963 and winning four; and appearing in six consecutive finals from 1969 to 1974 and winning four.

College soccer continued growing throughout the 1970s, with the NCAA adding a men's Division III in 1974 to accommodate the growing number of schools. Indiana University's men's soccer program achieved success in the 1980s, 1990s, and 2000s with 8 national championships, 6 Hermann Trophy winners (national player of the year), and 13 national team players. From 1973 to 2003 no team won more men's national championships or had more NCAA College Cup appearances than Indiana. Virginia won a record four consecutive men's national championships from 1991 to 1994 under head coach Bruce Arena.

The first college women's varsity soccer team was established at Castleton State College, now known as Castleton University, in Vermont in the mid-1960s. A major factor in the growth of women's college soccer was the passage of the Education Amendments of 1972, which included Title IX that mandated equal access and equal spending on athletic programs at college institutions. As a result, college varsity soccer programs for women were established. Since at least 1977, African American and women coaches have been underrepresented and have a significantly shorter tenure as coaches.

By 1981, there were about a 100 varsity programs established in NCAA women's soccer, and even more club teams. The AIAW (Association for Intercollegiate Athletics for Women), was established in the mid-1970s and began sponsoring women's varsity programs. It establishing an informal national championship in 1980, which Cortland State won. A year later in 1981, the tournament was hosted by the University of North Carolina, which ended up winning the tournament as well.

In 1982, the NCAA began to sponsor women's sports and all schools switched into the NCAA.  One major difference in the growth of women's college soccer unlike men's college soccer, was that it did not start out primarily in one region of the country and spread through the decades. With help from men's soccer, the women's program was able to take root all over the country at once, and grow from there. The University of North Carolina, coached by Anson Dorrance,  immediately stood out as the ones to beat in the women's college game and remain that way up unto today. Of the first 20 NCAA championships, 16 were won by UNC, including nine in a row from 1986 to 1994.

Competition format
College soccer is played in the fall from August to December depending on if a team makes the tournament and how long they are in the tournament. Teams play conference and non-conference teams. The NCAA tournament is played in November to early December with the Final Four and Championship game played in December. There are 48 teams in the men's tournament and 64 teams in the women's tournament.

Proposed Division I men's season change
After many months of extended unofficial discussion, on August 22, 2016, NCAA Division I men's coaches and the National Soccer Coaches Association of America (NSCAA) officially began an "informational campaign" to build support for a proposed change of the playing schedule for Division I men's soccer. Under the proposed changes of the "Academic Year Season Model", the number of games on the Fall schedule and the number of mid-week games would be reduced, with games added in the Spring following a Winter break, and the NCAA Division I men's soccer tournament would be moved from November and December to May and June. In addition to more closely matching the professional season, the changes address issues of player health and safety and of the time demands on student-athletes. The proposal concerns only Division I men's soccer. While a large majority of men's coaches and players support the changes, only a small minority of women's coaches and players currently do so. At this time, there is only the "informational campaign" "...to educate our Athletic Directors, NCAA leadership, student athletes, coaches and fans on the advantages of this Academic Year Model," said Sasho Cirovski, NSCAA D1 Men's committee chair and University of Maryland head coach.

A formal proposal was made and a vote was scheduled to take place in April, 2020, but was postponed due to the COVID-19 pandemic.  During the 2020-2021 NCAA Tournament, rescheduled to the spring of 2021, broadcasters mentioned that the vote will take place in the spring of 2022.

Rules
While similar in general appearance, NCAA rules diverge significantly from FIFA Laws of the Game. A manager may make limited substitutions, and each player is allowed one re-entry which must occur in the second half of the match unless the substitution was caused by a player injury resulting from a caution or send-off. Since 2022, all playoff matches have an overtime period if the game remains tied after 90 minutes, but not the regular season. It consists of a regular two-half extra time period, but no golden goal. During playoff games, if neither team scores in the two ten-minute periods,  it would go to a penalty shootout. College soccer is played with a clock that can be stopped when signaled to by the referee for injuries, the issuing of cards, or when the referee believes a team is wasting time. The clock is also stopped after goals until play is restarted, and the clock generally counts down from 45:00 to 0:00 in each half. In most professional soccer leagues, there is an up-counting clock with the referee adding stoppage time to the end of each 45-minute half.

Double-jeopardy rule change
In February 2017, the NCAA rules committee met to discuss a proposed rule that would change the double jeopardy rule. If the last player was to foul a player and deny a goal scoring opportunity, this rule would instead give the referee the ability to choose to issue a yellow card, if they were to feel it was a proper attempt to get the ball. The change was approved.

Potential timekeeping change
On March 29, 2018, the NCAA announced that its rules committee had recommended that the organization align itself with FIFA timekeeping rules, with the new rule slated for adoption in the 2018 season. If this proposal had been adopted,
 Stadium clocks would count upward, and the displayed time would be based on the elapsed time of the game.
 The official time would be kept on-field by the referee.
 When the stadium clock indicated one minute remaining in a half or overtime period, the referee would signal the amount of stoppage time to the sideline, and a sign indicating the number of minutes of stoppage time would be displayed.
The committee felt that the then-current timekeeping system led to gamesmanship, specifically blatant delaying tactics, at the end of matches.

Potential season change
On January 15, 2020, a change in the time frame of the men's D1 season was proposed.9 Known as the Twenty-first Century Model, the proposal was to distribute the three-month fall season across the full academic year, making it both a fall and spring sport.10

The main motivations for the proposal were to reduce injury and improve the balance academic and other college experiences for athletes.11 In the fall during the regular season, teams may play 18 to 20 games over 10 weeks—an average of one match every 3.6 days—resulting in higher rates of injury compared to players who recovered for 6 or more days. Under the new schedule, there would be only one match per week.

When initially proposed, the changes were supported by the Atlantic Coast Conference, the Big Ten Conference, and the Pac-12 Conference. The proposal was to be voted on in April, 2020, but was indefinitely tabled due to NCAA D1 Legislative Committees prioritizing issues related to the COVID-19 pandemic.  During the 2020-2021 NCAA Tournament, broadcasters mentioned that the vote is scheduled for the spring of 2022.

Attendance leaders

Men's

Notes

Women's

College Cup

Men's

The following teams have won the College Cup two or more times.

Side Notes:
 † Co-champions—Game called due to weather
 ‡ Co-champions—Game was declared a tie

Women's

The following teams have won the College Cup.

Players
A number of American college soccer programs have developed players that have gone on to play professionally or for the U.S. national teams. Every year since its inception in 1996, Major League Soccer (MLS) has held a SuperDraft in which MLS teams draft young prospects. The draft picks in the MLS SuperDraft are often U.S.-based college soccer players. A similar format is held each year for the National Women's Soccer League (NWSL): the NWSL College Draft.

The Hermann Trophy is awarded annually by the Missouri Athletic Club to the top male and female college soccer players in the United States.At the start of the college soccer season a list of Hermann Trophy nominees is compiled.  Near the end of the college regular season, 15 players are announced as semifinalists. In early December the top three vote-getters for both the men's and women's trophy are announced as finalists. In an annual banquet held at the Missouri Athletic Club of St. Louis, the winners of the two awards are announced. Hermann Trophy winners who have starred for the U.S. national teams at multiple FIFA World Cups include Tony Meola (1989), Alexi Lalas (1991), and Claudio Reyna (1993), Michelle Akers (1988), Shannon Higgins (1989), Kristine Lilly (1991), Mia Hamm (1991–92), Tisha Venturini (1994), Shannon MacMillan (1995), Cindy Parlow (1997–98), Aly Wagner (2002), Kelley O'Hara (2009), Christen Press (2010), Crystal Dunn (2012) and Morgan Brian (2013–14).
 
Many top American men's college soccer players play for separate teams in the Premier Development League (PDL) during the summer. One college club, the BYU Cougars men's team, has foregone playing in the NCAA or NAIA and instead play all of their games in the PDL.

Several coaches who have won the College Cup have gone on to coach Division I professional soccer or even the U.S. national teams. The most well-known NCAA men's team coaches who have gone on to success in the professional ranks include Bruce Arena (four College Cups with Virginia from 1991 to 1994), and Sigi Schmid (won two College Cups with UCLA in 1985 and 1990). On the women's side, North Carolina coach Anson Dorrance coached the United States women's national soccer team during its early years from 1986 to 1994 and led the team to win the inaugural 1991 FIFA Women's World Cup in China. Former UCLA Bruins coach Jill Ellis led the national team to win its third World Cup at the 2015 FIFA Women's World Cup in Canada.

Many women's college soccer players take opportunities to play professionally in the National Women's Soccer League (NWSL) and in Europe, Asia, and Australia. Players are also chosen from college to be a member of the United States women's national soccer team. The NWSL started in 2012 and now consists of 10 teams. This most recent draft in 2017 took place in Los Angeles, California with Rose Lavelle from Wisconsin going in the first round to the Boston Breakers.

Recent winners of the Mac Hermann Trophy include international players such as Kadeisha Buchanan (2016), Raquel Rodríguez (2015), Morgan Brian (2014, 2013) and Crystal Dunn (2012).

College soccer players outside the United States 
Due to its proximity to the United States, 19 out of the 22 Canada women's national under-20 soccer team players at the 2022 FIFA U-20 Women's World Cup play in the NCAA. Christine Sinclair, captain of the Canada women's national soccer team, played for the Portland Pilots women's soccer team from 2001 to 2005.

Many college soccer players in Japan and South Korea have gone on to represent their national teams. These two countries have a similar "college soccer to national team" pipeline found in the United States. Historically, a majority of players of have represented the South Korea national under-20 football team has played soccer in college. The team's most successful result was reaching the finals of the 2019 FIFA U-20 World Cup. Similarly, the South Korea women's national under-20 football team also has players from college soccer. In the 2022 FIFA U-20 Women's World Cup, 16 players of the 21-woman squad were in college. Nine players of the Japan national football team at the 2022 FIFA World Cup have a college soccer background.

Foreign players in the United States
Recently, more and more foreign players have been introduced to American college soccer. Getting recruited from overseas, these foreign players are joining teams of many college teams. 2015 was the first year that there was a flood of international players joining these teams. These players are said to join college soccer in hopes of playing professionally in Major League Soccer and also to get the education that the United States provides, with uncertanties raised about the playing time and type of education they would receive in their countries.

College soccer in the United States
College soccer in the United States is sponsored by the National Collegiate Athletic Association (NCAA), the sports regulatory body for major universities, and by the governing bodies for smaller universities and colleges. This sport is played on a rectangular field of the dimensions of about 70–75 yards sideline to sideline (width), and 115–120 yards goal line to goal line (length).

College soccer teams play a variety of conference and non-conference games throughout the fall season, with the season culminating in the post-season tournament called the College Cup. The St. Louis University Billikens is the most successful men's team, having won 10 College Cups while the North Carolina Tar Heels led by head coach Anson Dorrance is the most successful women's college soccer team with 21 College Cup wins.

The best men's and women's college soccer player each year is awarded the Hermann Trophy.

Divisions and conferences in the United States
There are approximately 800 NCAA men's soccer programs—206 NCAA Division I, 207 Division II, and 408 Division III.
There are 959 NCAA women's soccer teams—310 Division I, 225 Division II, and 424 Division III.

The number of men's Division I programs has stayed roughly constant since the mid-1990s, but the number of women's Division I programs has increased from 190 in 1995–96 to 310 in 2008–09.

NCAA Division I
Among Division I all-sports conferences, only the Mid-Eastern Athletic Conference does not sponsor soccer at all. All of the remaining 31 conferences sponsor women's soccer, but eight of these do not sponsor men's soccer. One conference that participated in the 2022 season will no longer sponsor men's soccer after that season. 

American Athletic Conference
America East Conference
ASUN Conference
Atlantic Coast Conference
Atlantic 10 Conference
Big East Conference
Big Sky Conference 
Big South Conference
Big Ten Conference
Big 12 Conference 
Big West Conference
Colonial Athletic Association
Conference USA 
Horizon League
Ivy League
Metro Atlantic Athletic Conference
Mid-American Conference 
Missouri Valley Conference
Mountain West Conference 
Northeast Conference
Ohio Valley Conference 
Pac-12 Conference
Patriot League
Southeastern Conference 
Southern Conference
Southland Conference 
Southwestern Athletic Conference 
The Summit League
Sun Belt Conference
West Coast Conference
Western Athletic Conference
Independents

Notes

NCAA Division II
Of the 23 Division II all-sports conferences, only the Central Intercollegiate Athletic Association and the Southern Intercollegiate Athletic Conference do not sponsor soccer at all. All of the remaining conferences sponsor soccer for both sexes except the Northern Sun Intercollegiate Conference, which sponsors the sport for women only.

 
California Collegiate Athletic Association
Central Atlantic Collegiate Conference
Conference Carolinas
East Coast Conference
Great American Conference
Great Lakes Intercollegiate Athletic Conference
Great Lakes Valley Conference
Great Midwest Athletic Conference
Great Northwest Athletic Conference
Gulf South Conference
Lone Star Conference
Mid-America Intercollegiate Athletics Association
Mountain East Conference
Northeast-10 Conference
Northern Sun Intercollegiate Conference 
Pacific West Conference
Peach Belt Conference
Pennsylvania State Athletic Conference
Rocky Mountain Athletic Conference
South Atlantic Conference
Sunshine State Conference
NCAA Division II independent schools

Notes

NCAA Division III
All Division III all-sports conferences sponsor soccer for both sexes except the Wisconsin Intercollegiate Athletic Conference, which sponsors the sport for women only.

 
Allegheny Mountain Collegiate Conference
American Rivers Conference
American Southwest Conference
Atlantic East Conference
Centennial Conference
City University of New York Athletic Conference
Coast to Coast Athletic Conference
College Conference of Illinois and Wisconsin
Collegiate Conference of the South
Colonial States Athletic Conference
Commonwealth Coast Conference
Empire 8
Great Northeast Athletic Conference
Heartland Collegiate Athletic Conference
Landmark Conference
Liberty League
MAC Commonwealth
MAC Freedom
Massachusetts State Collegiate Athletic Conference
Michigan Intercollegiate Athletic Association
Midwest Conference
Minnesota Intercollegiate Athletic Conference
New England Collegiate Conference
New England Small College Athletic Conference
New England Women's and Men's Athletic Conference
New Jersey Athletic Conference
North Atlantic Conference
North Coast Athletic Conference
Northern Athletics Collegiate Conference
Northwest Conference
Ohio Athletic Conference
Old Dominion Athletic Conference
Presidents' Athletic Conference
St. Louis Intercollegiate Athletic Conference
Skyline Conference
Southern Athletic Association
Southern California Intercollegiate Athletic Conference
Southern Collegiate Athletic Conference
State University of New York Athletic Conference
United East Conference
University Athletic Association
Upper Midwest Athletic Conference
USA South Athletic Conference
Wisconsin Intercollegiate Athletic Conference 
NCAA Division III independent schools

Notes

Divisions and Conferences internationally

United Kingdom 
In the United Kingdom, the BUCS Football League governs association football in colleges and universities. There are currently 450 teams spread across the league.

Asia 
In South Korea, the university association football competition is called the U-League. Created in 2008, it is the first organized league competition for university association football teams and operates outside of the regular Korean association football league structure.

In Japan, the All Japan University Football Championship and the All Japan Women's University Football Championship are the main tournaments for universities across Japan. Both of them are played annually with 24 participating universities and distinct qualification series. The 2022 edition of both men's and women's tournaments are taking place between December 2022 and January 2023.

In the Philippines, the UAAP Football Championship is contested by the eight members schools of the University Athletic Association of the Philippines. NCAA Philippines also sponsors a football tournament.

In Vietnam, the university association football competition is called the SV-League, which is held annually among teams of university students.

Canada
In Canada, there are two organizations that regulate university and collegiate athletics:

U Sports
Atlantic University Sport (AUS)
Canada West Universities Athletic Association (CWUAA)
Ontario University Athletics (OUA)
Réseau du sport étudiant du Québec (RSEQ; translates to Quebec Student Sports Federation)

Canadian Colleges Athletic Association
Atlantic Colleges Athletic Association (ACAA)
Réseau du sport étudiant du Québec (RSEQ)
Ontario Colleges Athletic Association (OCAA)
Alberta Colleges Athletic Conference (ACAC)
British Columbia Colleges Athletic Association (BCCAA)

South Africa 
Varsity Football is a yearly tournament contested by South African universities in the intercollegiate league Varsity Sports (South Africa). As of the 2022 season, 8 teams participate in each of the men's and women's divisions.

National college soccer awards

Hermann Trophy
Soccer America Player of the Year
ISAA Player of the Year
ISAA Goalkeeper of the Year
NSCAA Coach of the Year

See also
 
List of NCAA Division I men's soccer programs
List of NCAA Division I women's soccer programs
List of NCAA Division II men's soccer programs
NCAA Division I men's soccer tournament
NCAA Division I Women's Soccer Championship
NCAA Division I men's soccer First-Team All-Americans
Soccer in the United States
College athletics in the United States
College athletics
U Sports
Canadian Colleges Athletic Association (CCAA)
Canadian Colleges Athletic Association Soccer National Championships

Notes

References

External links

 NCAA men's and women's
 NAIA men's and women's
 USCAA men's and women's
 NJCAA men's and women's
 CCCAA men's and women's 
 College Soccer News
 College Soccer Rankings

College soccer